Kerala Johnson Snyder is an American musicologist and educator. She is Professor Emerita of Musicology and Affiliate Faculty of Organ, Sacred Music and Historical Keyboards at the Eastman School of Music, University of Rochester. She previously taught at Yale University.

Early life and education
Snyder is a graduate of Wellesley College  (BA) and Harvard Divinity School. She received her Ph.D. from Yale University. From 1969 to 1981 she taught at Yale University and from 1981 to 1987 at the Hartt School of Music of the University of Hartford. From 1987, she worked with the Eastman School of Music.

She is an expert of North German and Northern European baroque music especially in organ repertoire. She wrote the authoritative biography of the Danish-German organist and composer Dieterich Buxtehude.

References

Year of birth missing (living people)
Living people
American musicologists
Eastman School of Music faculty
Yale University faculty
Yale University alumni
Wellesley College alumni
Harvard Divinity School alumni
University of Hartford faculty
American women musicologists
Women music educators
21st-century American women